The noble gases (historically also the inert gases; sometimes referred to as aerogens) make up a class of chemical elements with similar properties; under standard conditions, they are all odorless, colorless, monatomic gases with very low chemical reactivity. The six naturally occurring noble gases are helium (He), neon (Ne), argon (Ar), krypton (Kr), xenon (Xe), and the radioactive radon (Rn).

Oganesson (Og) is a synthetically produced highly radioactive element. Although IUPAC has used the term "noble gas" interchangeably with "group 18" and thus included oganesson, it may not be significantly chemically noble and is predicted to break the trend and be reactive due to relativistic effects. Because of the extremely short 0.7 ms half-life of its only known isotope, its chemistry has not yet been investigated.

For the first six periods of the periodic table, the noble gases are exactly the members of group 18. Noble gases are typically highly unreactive except when under particular extreme conditions. The inertness of noble gases makes them very suitable in applications where reactions are not wanted. For example, argon is used in incandescent lamps to prevent the hot tungsten filament from oxidizing; also, helium is used in breathing gas by deep-sea divers to prevent oxygen, nitrogen and carbon dioxide toxicity.

The properties of the noble gases can be well explained by modern theories of atomic structure: Their outer shell of valence electrons is considered to be "full", giving them little tendency to participate in chemical reactions, and it has been possible to prepare only a few hundred noble gas compounds.

Neon, argon, krypton, and xenon are obtained from air in an air separation unit using the methods of liquefaction of gases and fractional distillation. Helium is sourced from natural gas fields that have high concentrations of helium in the natural gas, using cryogenic gas separation techniques, and radon is usually isolated from the radioactive decay of dissolved radium, thorium, or uranium compounds. Noble gases have several important applications in industries such as lighting, welding, and space exploration. After the risks caused by the flammability of hydrogen became apparent in the Hindenburg disaster, it was replaced with helium in blimps and balloons.

History
Noble gas is translated from the German noun , first used in 1898 by Hugo Erdmann to indicate their extremely low level of reactivity. The name makes an analogy to the term "noble metals", which also have low reactivity. The noble gases have also been referred to as inert gases, but this label is deprecated as many noble gas compounds are now known. Rare gases is another term that was used, but this is also inaccurate because argon forms a fairly considerable part (0.94% by volume, 1.3% by mass) of the Earth's atmosphere due to decay of radioactive potassium-40.

Pierre Janssen and Joseph Norman Lockyer had discovered a new element on 18 August 1868 while looking at the chromosphere of the Sun, and named it helium after the Greek word for the Sun, . No chemical analysis was possible at the time, but helium was later found to be a noble gas. Before them, in 1784, the English chemist and physicist Henry Cavendish had discovered that air contains a small proportion of a substance less reactive than nitrogen. A century later, in 1895, Lord Rayleigh discovered that samples of nitrogen from the air were of a different density than nitrogen resulting from chemical reactions. Along with Scottish scientist William Ramsay at University College, London, Lord Rayleigh theorized that the nitrogen extracted from air was mixed with another gas, leading to an experiment that successfully isolated a new element, argon, from the Greek word  ("idle" or "lazy"). With this discovery, they realized an entire class of gases was missing from the periodic table. During his search for argon, Ramsay also managed to isolate helium for the first time while heating cleveite, a mineral. In 1902, having accepted the evidence for the elements helium and argon, Dmitri Mendeleev included these noble gases as group 0 in his arrangement of the elements, which would later become the periodic table.

Ramsay continued his search for these gases using the method of fractional distillation to separate liquid air into several components. Radon was first identified in 1898 by Friedrich Ernst Dorn, and was named radium emanation, but was not considered a noble gas until 1904 when its characteristics were found to be similar to those of other noble gases. Rayleigh and Ramsay received the 1904 Nobel Prizes in Physics and in Chemistry, respectively, for their discovery of the noble gases; in the words of J. E. Cederblom, then president of the Royal Swedish Academy of Sciences, "the discovery of an entirely new group of elements, of which no single representative had been known with any certainty, is something utterly unique in the history of chemistry, being intrinsically an advance in science of peculiar significance".

The discovery of the noble gases aided in the development of a general understanding of atomic structure. In 1895, French chemist Henri Moissan attempted to form a reaction between fluorine, the most electronegative element, and argon, one of the noble gases, but failed. Scientists were unable to prepare compounds of argon until the end of the 20th century, but these attempts helped to develop new theories of atomic structure. Learning from these experiments, Danish physicist Niels Bohr proposed in 1913 that the electrons in atoms are arranged in shells surrounding the nucleus, and that for all noble gases except helium the outermost shell always contains eight electrons. In 1916, Gilbert N. Lewis formulated the octet rule, which concluded an octet of electrons in the outer shell was the most stable arrangement for any atom; this arrangement caused them to be unreactive with other elements since they did not require any more electrons to complete their outer shell.

In 1962, Neil Bartlett discovered the first chemical compound of a noble gas, xenon hexafluoroplatinate. Compounds of other noble gases were discovered soon after: in 1962 for radon, radon difluoride, which was identified by radiotracer techniques and in 1963 for krypton, krypton difluoride.

In October 2006, scientists from the Joint Institute for Nuclear Research and Lawrence Livermore National Laboratory successfully created synthetically oganesson, the seventh element in group 18, by bombarding californium with calcium.

Physical and atomic properties

The noble gases have weak interatomic force, and consequently have very low melting and boiling points. They are all monatomic gases under standard conditions, including the elements with larger atomic masses than many normally solid elements. The noble gases up to xenon have multiple stable isotopes. Radon has no stable isotopes; its longest-lived isotope, 222Rn, has a half-life of 3.8 days and decays to form helium and polonium, which ultimately decays to lead. Melting and boiling points increase going down the group.

The noble gas atoms, like atoms in most groups, increase steadily in atomic radius from one period to the next due to the increasing number of electrons. The size of the atom is related to several properties. For example, the ionization potential decreases with an increasing radius because the valence electrons in the larger noble gases are farther away from the nucleus and are therefore not held as tightly together by the atom. Noble gases have the largest ionization potential among the elements of each period, which reflects the stability of their electron configuration and is related to their relative lack of chemical reactivity. Some of the heavier noble gases, however, have ionization potentials small enough to be comparable to those of other elements and molecules. It was the insight that xenon has an ionization potential similar to that of the oxygen molecule that led Bartlett to attempt oxidizing xenon using platinum hexafluoride, an oxidizing agent known to be strong enough to react with oxygen. Noble gases cannot accept an electron to form stable anions; that is, they have a negative electron affinity.

The macroscopic physical properties of the noble gases are dominated by the weak van der Waals forces between the atoms. The attractive force increases with the size of the atom as a result of the increase in polarizability and the decrease in ionization potential. This results in systematic group trends: as one goes down group 18, the atomic radius, and with it the interatomic forces, increases, resulting in an increasing melting point, boiling point, enthalpy of vaporization, and solubility. The increase in density is due to the increase in atomic mass.

The noble gases are nearly ideal gases under standard conditions, but their deviations from the ideal gas law provided important clues for the study of intermolecular interactions. The Lennard-Jones potential, often used to model intermolecular interactions, was deduced in 1924 by John Lennard-Jones from experimental data on argon before the development of quantum mechanics provided the tools for understanding intermolecular forces from first principles. The theoretical analysis of these interactions became tractable because the noble gases are monatomic and the atoms spherical, which means that the interaction between the atoms is independent of direction, or isotropic.

Chemical properties

The noble gases are colorless, odorless, tasteless, and nonflammable under standard conditions. They were once labeled group 0 in the periodic table because it was believed they had a valence of zero, meaning their atoms cannot combine with those of other elements to form compounds. However, it was later discovered some do indeed form compounds, causing this label to fall into disuse.

Electron configuration

Like other groups, the members of this family show patterns in its electron configuration, especially the outermost shells resulting in trends in chemical behavior:

The noble gases have full valence electron shells. Valence electrons are the outermost electrons of an atom and are normally the only electrons that participate in chemical bonding. Atoms with full valence electron shells are extremely stable and therefore do not tend to form chemical bonds and have little tendency to gain or lose electrons. However, heavier noble gases such as radon are held less firmly together by electromagnetic force than lighter noble gases such as helium, making it easier to remove outer electrons from heavy noble gases.

As a result of a full shell, the noble gases can be used in conjunction with the electron configuration notation to form the noble gas notation. To do this, the nearest noble gas that precedes the element in question is written first, and then the electron configuration is continued from that point forward. For example, the electron notation of
This more compact notation makes it easier to identify elements, and is shorter than writing out the full notation of atomic orbitals.

The noble gases cross the boundary between blocks—helium is an s-element whereas the rest of members are p-elements—which is unusual among the IUPAC groups. All other IUPAC groups contain elements from one block each. This causes some inconsistencies in trends across the table, and on those grounds some chemists have proposed that helium should be moved to group 2 to be with other s2 elements, but this change has not generally been adopted.

Compounds

The noble gases show extremely low chemical reactivity; consequently, only a few hundred noble gas compounds have been formed. Neutral compounds in which helium and neon are involved in chemical bonds have not been formed (although some helium-containing ions exist and there is some theoretical evidence for a few neutral helium-containing ones), while xenon, krypton, and argon have shown only minor reactivity. The reactivity follows the order Ne < He < Ar < Kr < Xe < Rn ≪ Og.

In 1933, Linus Pauling predicted that the heavier noble gases could form compounds with fluorine and oxygen. He predicted the existence of krypton hexafluoride and xenon hexafluoride, speculated that  might exist as an unstable compound, and suggested that xenic acid could form perxenate salts. These predictions were shown to be generally accurate, except that  is now thought to be both thermodynamically and kinetically unstable.

Xenon compounds are the most numerous of the noble gas compounds that have been formed. Most of them have the xenon atom in the oxidation state of +2, +4, +6, or +8 bonded to highly electronegative atoms such as fluorine or oxygen, as in xenon difluoride, xenon tetrafluoride, xenon hexafluoride, xenon tetroxide, and sodium perxenate. Xenon reacts with fluorine to form numerous xenon fluorides according to the following equations:

Xe + F2 → XeF2
Xe + 2F2 → XeF4
Xe + 3F2 → XeF6

As of 2007, about five hundred compounds of xenon bonded to other elements have been identified, including organoxenon compounds (containing xenon bonded to carbon), and xenon bonded to nitrogen, chlorine, gold, mercury, and xenon itself. Compounds of xenon bound to boron, hydrogen, bromine, iodine, beryllium, sulphur, titanium, copper, and silver have also been observed but only at low temperatures in noble gas matrices, or in supersonic noble gas jets.

Radon is more reactive than xenon, and forms chemical bonds more easily than xenon does. However, due to the high radioactivity and short half-life of radon isotopes, only a few fluorides and oxides of radon have been formed in practice. Radon goes further towards metallic behavior than xenon; the difluoride RnF2 is highly ionic, and cationic Rn2+ is formed in halogen fluoride solutions. For this reason, kinetic hindrance makes it difficult to oxidize radon beyond the +2 state. Only tracer experiments appear to have succeeded in doing so, probably forming RnF4, RnF6, and RnO3.

Krypton is less reactive than xenon, but several compounds have been reported with krypton in the oxidation state of +2. Krypton difluoride is the most notable and easily characterized. Under extreme conditions, krypton reacts with fluorine to form KrF2 according to the following equation:

Kr + F2 → KrF2

Compounds in which krypton forms a single bond to nitrogen and oxygen have also been characterized, but are only stable below  and  respectively.

Krypton atoms chemically bound to other nonmetals (hydrogen, chlorine, carbon) as well as some late transition metals (copper, silver, gold) have also been observed, but only either at low temperatures in noble gas matrices, or in supersonic noble gas jets. Similar conditions were used to obtain the first few compounds of argon in 2000, such as argon fluorohydride (HArF), and some bound to the late transition metals copper, silver, and gold. As of 2007, no stable neutral molecules involving covalently bound helium or neon are known.

Extrapolation from periodic trends predict that oganesson should be the most reactive of the noble gases; more sophisticated theoretical treatments indicate greater reactivity than such extrapolations suggest, to the point where the applicability of the descriptor "noble gas" has been questioned. Oganesson is expected to be rather like silicon or tin in group 14: a reactive element with a common +4 and a less common +2 state, which at room temperature and pressure is not a gas but rather a solid semiconductor. Empirical / experimental testing will be required to validate these predictions. (On the other hand, flerovium, despite being in group 14, is predicted to be unusually volatile, which suggests noble gas-like properties.)

The noble gases—including helium—can form stable molecular ions in the gas phase. The simplest is the helium hydride molecular ion, HeH+, discovered in 1925. Because it is composed of the two most abundant elements in the universe, hydrogen and helium, it was believed to occur naturally in the interstellar medium, and it was finally detected in April 2019 using the airborne SOFIA telescope. In addition to these ions, there are many known neutral excimers of the noble gases. These are compounds such as ArF and KrF that are stable only when in an excited electronic state; some of them find application in excimer lasers.

In addition to the compounds where a noble gas atom is involved in a covalent bond, noble gases also form non-covalent compounds. The clathrates, first described in 1949, consist of a noble gas atom trapped within cavities of crystal lattices of certain organic and inorganic substances. The essential condition for their formation is that the guest (noble gas) atoms must be of appropriate size to fit in the cavities of the host crystal lattice. For instance, argon, krypton, and xenon form clathrates with hydroquinone, but helium and neon do not because they are too small or insufficiently polarizable to be retained. Neon, argon, krypton, and xenon also form clathrate hydrates, where the noble gas is trapped in ice.

Noble gases can form endohedral fullerene compounds, in which the noble gas atom is trapped inside a fullerene molecule. In 1993, it was discovered that when , a spherical molecule consisting of 60 carbon atoms, is exposed to noble gases at high pressure, complexes such as  can be formed (the @ notation indicates He is contained inside  but not covalently bound to it). As of 2008, endohedral complexes with helium, neon, argon, krypton, and xenon have been created. These compounds have found use in the study of the structure and reactivity of fullerenes by means of the nuclear magnetic resonance of the noble gas atom.

Noble gas compounds such as xenon difluoride are considered to be hypervalent because they violate the octet rule. Bonding in such compounds can be explained using a three-center four-electron bond model. This model, first proposed in 1951, considers bonding of three collinear atoms. Bonding results from the combination of a filled p-orbital from Xe with one half-filled p-orbital from each F atom, resulting in a filled bonding orbital, a filled non-bonding orbital, and an empty antibonding orbital. The highest occupied molecular orbital is localized on the two terminal atoms. This represents a localization of charge that is facilitated by the high electronegativity of fluorine.

The chemistry of the heavier noble gases, krypton and xenon, are well established. The chemistry of the lighter ones, argon and helium, is still at an early stage, while a neon compound is yet to be identified.

Occurrence and production
The abundances of the noble gases in the universe decrease as their atomic numbers increase. Helium is the most common element in the universe after hydrogen, with a mass fraction of about 24%. Most of the helium in the universe was formed during Big Bang nucleosynthesis, but the amount of helium is steadily increasing due to the fusion of hydrogen in stellar nucleosynthesis (and, to a very slight degree, the alpha decay of heavy elements). Abundances on Earth follow different trends; for example, helium is only the third most abundant noble gas in the atmosphere. The reason is that there is no primordial helium in the atmosphere; due to the small mass of the atom, helium cannot be retained by the Earth's gravitational field. Helium on Earth comes from the alpha decay of heavy elements such as uranium and thorium found in the Earth's crust, and tends to accumulate in natural gas deposits. The abundance of argon, on the other hand, is increased as a result of the beta decay of potassium-40, also found in the Earth's crust, to form argon-40, which is the most abundant isotope of argon on Earth despite being relatively rare in the Solar System. This process is the basis for the potassium-argon dating method. Xenon has an unexpectedly low abundance in the atmosphere, in what has been called the missing xenon problem; one theory is that the missing xenon may be trapped in minerals inside the Earth's crust. After the discovery of xenon dioxide, research showed that Xe can substitute for Si in quartz. Radon is formed in the lithosphere by the alpha decay of radium. It can seep into buildings through cracks in their foundation and accumulate in areas that are not well ventilated. Due to its high radioactivity, radon presents a significant health hazard; it is implicated in an estimated 21,000 lung cancer deaths per year in the United States alone. Oganesson does not occur in nature and is instead created manually by scientists.

For large-scale use, helium is extracted by fractional distillation from natural gas, which can contain up to 7% helium.

Neon, argon, krypton, and xenon are obtained from air using the methods of liquefaction of gases, to convert elements to a liquid state, and fractional distillation, to separate mixtures into component parts. Helium is typically produced by separating it from natural gas, and radon is isolated from the radioactive decay of radium compounds. The prices of the noble gases are influenced by their natural abundance, with argon being the cheapest and xenon the most expensive. As an example, the adjacent table lists the 2004 prices in the United States for laboratory quantities of each gas.

Applications

Noble gases have very low boiling and melting points, which makes them useful as cryogenic refrigerants. Liquid neon, although it does not reach temperatures as low as liquid helium, also finds use in cryogenics because it has over 40 times more refrigerating capacity than liquid helium and over three times more than liquid hydrogen.

Helium is used as a component of breathing gases to replace nitrogen, due its low solubility in fluids, especially in lipids. Gases are absorbed by the blood and body tissues when under pressure like in scuba diving, which causes an anesthetic effect known as nitrogen narcosis. Due to its reduced solubility, little helium is taken into cell membranes, and when helium is used to replace part of the breathing mixtures, such as in trimix or heliox, a decrease in the narcotic effect of the gas at depth is obtained. Helium's reduced solubility offers further advantages for the condition known as decompression sickness, or the bends. The reduced amount of dissolved gas in the body means that fewer gas bubbles form during the decrease in pressure of the ascent. Another noble gas, argon, is considered the best option for use as a drysuit inflation gas for scuba diving. Helium is also used as filling gas in nuclear fuel rods for nuclear reactors.

Since the Hindenburg disaster in 1937, helium has replaced hydrogen as a lifting gas in blimps and balloons due to its lightness and incombustibility, despite an 8.6% decrease in buoyancy.

In many applications, the noble gases are used to provide an inert atmosphere. Argon is used in the synthesis of air-sensitive compounds that are sensitive to nitrogen. Solid argon is also used for the study of very unstable compounds, such as reactive intermediates, by trapping them in an inert matrix at very low temperatures. Helium is used as the carrier medium in gas chromatography, as a filler gas for thermometers, and in devices for measuring radiation, such as the Geiger counter and the bubble chamber. Helium and argon are both commonly used to shield welding arcs and the surrounding base metal from the atmosphere during welding and cutting, as well as in other metallurgical processes and in the production of silicon for the semiconductor industry.

Noble gases are commonly used in lighting because of their lack of chemical reactivity. Argon, mixed with nitrogen, is used as a filler gas for incandescent light bulbs. Krypton is used in high-performance light bulbs, which have higher color temperatures and greater efficiency, because it reduces the rate of evaporation of the filament more than argon; halogen lamps, in particular, use krypton mixed with small amounts of compounds of iodine or bromine. The noble gases glow in distinctive colors when used inside gas-discharge lamps, such as "neon lights". These lights are called after neon but often contain other gases and phosphors, which add various hues to the orange-red color of neon. Xenon is commonly used in xenon arc lamps, which, due to their nearly continuous spectrum that resembles daylight, find application in film projectors and as automobile headlamps.

The noble gases are used in excimer lasers, which are based on short-lived electronically excited molecules known as excimers. The excimers used for lasers may be noble gas dimers such as Ar2, Kr2 or Xe2, or more commonly, the noble gas is combined with a halogen in excimers such as ArF, KrF, XeF, or XeCl. These lasers produce ultraviolet light, which, due to its short wavelength (193 nm for ArF and 248 nm for KrF), allows for high-precision imaging. Excimer lasers have many industrial, medical, and scientific applications. They are used for microlithography and microfabrication, which are essential for integrated circuit manufacture, and for laser surgery, including laser angioplasty and eye surgery.

Some noble gases have direct application in medicine. Helium is sometimes used to improve the ease of breathing of asthma sufferers. Xenon is used as an anesthetic because of its high solubility in lipids, which makes it more potent than the usual nitrous oxide, and because it is readily eliminated from the body, resulting in faster recovery. Xenon finds application in medical imaging of the lungs through hyperpolarized MRI. Radon, which is highly radioactive and is only available in minute amounts, is used in radiotherapy.

Noble gases, particularly xenon, are predominantly used in ion engines due to their inertness. Since ion engines are not driven by chemical reactions, chemically inert fuels are desired to prevent unwanted reaction between the fuel and anything else on the engine.

Oganesson is too unstable to work with and has no known application other than research.

Discharge color

The color of gas discharge emission depends on several factors, including the following:

 discharge parameters (local value of current density and electric field, temperature, etc. – note the color variation along the discharge in the top row);
 gas purity (even small fraction of certain gases can affect color);
 material of the discharge tube envelope – note suppression of the UV and blue components in the bottom-row tubes made of thick household glass.

See also
Noble gas (data page), for extended tables of physical properties.
Noble metal, for metals that are resistant to corrosion or oxidation.
Inert gas, for any gas that is not reactive under normal circumstances.
Industrial gas
Neutronium
Octet rule

Notes

References

 
 
 
 
 
 
 
 

 
Groups (periodic table)